George M. Williamson may refer to:

George Williamson (diplomat) (1829-1882), the American diplomat George McWillie Williamson
George M. Williamson (architect) (1892–1979), American architect

See also
George Williamson (disambiguation)